9909 Eschenbach, provisional designation , is a Florian asteroid from the inner regions of the asteroid belt, roughly 10 kilometers in diameter.

The asteroid was discovered on 26 March 1971, by Dutch astronomer couple Ingrid and Cornelis van Houten, as well as Dutch–American astronomer Tom Gehrels. The asteroid was spotted during the Palomar–Leiden survey by examining photographic plates taken at Palomar Observatory, California, United States. It was named after medieval knight and poet Wolfram von Eschenbach.

Orbit and classification 

Eschenbach is a member of the Flora family. It orbits the Sun in the inner main-belt at a distance of 2.0–2.7 AU once every 3 years and 7 months (1,314 days). Its orbit has an eccentricity of 0.16 and an inclination of 4° with respect to the ecliptic.

Survey designation 

The survey designation "T-1" stands for the first Palomar–Leiden Trojan survey, named after the fruitful collaboration of the Palomar and Leiden Observatory in the 1960s and 1970s. Gehrels used Palomar's Samuel Oschin telescope (also known as the 48-inch Schmidt Telescope), and shipped the photographic plates to Ingrid and Cornelis van Houten at Leiden Observatory where astrometry was carried out. The trio are credited with the discovery of several thousand minor planets.

Physical characteristics

Diameter and albedo 

According to the surveys carried out by the Infrared Astronomical Satellite IRAS and NASA's Wide-field Infrared Survey Explorer with its subsequent NEOWISE mission, Eschenbach measures 23.4 and 3.404 kilometers in diameter, respectively. NEOWISE also finds an exceptionally high albedo of 0.460 for the body's surface. It has an absolute magnitude of 13.8

Lightcurves 

As of 2017, the asteroid's rotation period and shape remain unknown.

Naming 

This minor planet was named after German medieval knight and poet Wolfram von Eschenbach (1168–1220) one of the greatest poets of his time along with Gottfried von Strassburg and Hartmann von Aue (also see ). Wolfram von Eschenbach is known for his epic Parzival and for two other narrative works: the fragmentary Titurel and the unfinished Willehalm. The official naming citation was published by the Minor Planet Center on 2 April 1999.

References

External links 
 Asteroid Lightcurve Database (LCDB), query form (info )
 Dictionary of Minor Planet Names, Google books
 Asteroids and comets rotation curves, CdR – Observatoire de Genève, Raoul Behrend
 Discovery Circumstances: Numbered Minor Planets (5001)-(10000) – Minor Planet Center
 
 

009909
Discoveries by Cornelis Johannes van Houten
Discoveries by Ingrid van Houten-Groeneveld
Discoveries by Tom Gehrels
4355
Named minor planets
19710326